The 2007–08 Lebanese FA Cup was the 36th edition of the national football cup competition of Lebanon. It started with the first round on 20 October 2007, and ended on 3 July 2008 with the final. The cup winners were guaranteed a place in the 2009 AFC Cup.

Pre-qualifying stage

First round

Intermediate Round

Final round

Qualifying stage

Semifinal round

Final round

Proper Rounds

Round of 16

Quarterfinals

Semi-finals

Final

External links
 Goalzz.com
 RSSSF

Lebanese FA Cup seasons
Cup